Namakoro Koto te Niaré (born 4 June 1943 in Bamako) is a Malian former discus thrower who competed in the 1968 Summer Olympics, in the 1972 Summer Olympics, and in the 1980 Summer Olympics. He is the father of French shot putter Yves Niaré and French High Jumper Gaëlle Niaré.

References

1943 births
Living people
Malian male discus throwers
Olympic athletes of Mali
Athletes (track and field) at the 1968 Summer Olympics
Athletes (track and field) at the 1972 Summer Olympics
Athletes (track and field) at the 1980 Summer Olympics
Sportspeople from Bamako
African Games gold medalists for Mali
African Games medalists in athletics (track and field)
Athletes (track and field) at the 1965 All-Africa Games
21st-century Malian people